The Santa Fe River is a  river in northern Florida. The headwaters of the river are Lake Santa Fe, near Keystone Heights. The Santa Fe River is usually a slow-flowing river. This slow speed, combined with the abundant leaf-drop from nearby trees, especially Bald Cypress, leads to a very dark-brown river due to dissolved tannins.

The river drops into a large sinkhole in O'Leno State Park and reappears in the adjacent River Rise Preserve State Park. The land over the underground section of the river, referred to as a natural bridge, was used for the main route of the Spanish mission trail and the Bellamy Road to avoid a water crossing of the Santa Fe River.

Springs like Gilchrist Blue, Ginnie, Hornsby, Lily, Poe, and Rum Island springs are located at the banks of the river, mostly downstream of the river's reappearance above ground level. The area is sparsely populated compared to the rest of Florida, there have been sightings of animals like the black bear, bobcat, the rare Florida panther and due to the near-constant water temperatures along many portions of the river, manatees. As with many rivers in Florida, plant and animal fossil remnants are plentiful along the Santa Fe.

The tributaries of the Santa Fe include the New River, Olustee Creek, and the Ichetucknee River, another spring-fed river.  The Santa Fe empties into the Suwannee River near Branford, Florida.

The river derives its name from a Franciscan mission named Santa Fé de Toloca formerly located near the river.

List of crossings

References

External links 
 The Santa Fe River, saveoursuwannee.org
  Paddling on Santa Fe River, adventureoutpost.net
  Our Santa Fe River, oursantaferiver.org
  Kayak The Santa Fe River, Florida, irishwaterdogs.com

Rivers of Florida
Outstanding Florida Waters
Tributaries of the Suwannee River
Bodies of water of Columbia County, Florida
Bodies of water of Suwannee County, Florida
Bodies of water of Bradford County, Florida
Bodies of water of Baker County, Florida
Bodies of water of Union County, Florida
Bodies of water of Gilchrist County, Florida
Rivers of Alachua County, Florida
Subterranean rivers of the United States